Hobart Brown Upjohn (1876–1949) was an American architect, best known for designing a number of ecclesiastical and educational structures in New York and in North Carolina. He also designed a number of significant private homes.  His firm produced a total of about 150 projects, a third of which were in North Carolina.

He was born in New York City in 1876, a son of Richard M. Upjohn (1828–1903) and grandson of Richard Upjohn (1802–1878).  He received a degree in mechanical engineering from Stevens Institute of Technology in 1899.  He worked in his father's firm until 1903 and then opened his own practice in 1905.  He entered a partnership with George W. Conable (1866–1933) in 1908.  That partnership ended in 1914.  One of the works produced by the partnership was the 1909 Rye Town Park-Bathing Complex and Oakland Beach, added to the National Register of Historic Places in 2003.  He closed his practice in 1945 and died in 1949.

A number of his works are listed on the National Register of Historic Places.

Notable works
 Chapel of the Cross (Chapel Hill, North Carolina) Church (1925), Main Tower, and Cloister
 Hobart and William Smith Colleges, Geneva, New York
 Mead Memorial Chapel
 Roanoke Rapids High School, 800 Hamilton St., Roanoke Rapids, NC (Upjohn, Hobart Brown), NRHP-listed
 St. Athanasius Episcopal Church and Parish House and the Church of the Holy Comforter, Burlington, North Carolina
 Christ Episcopal Church, Parish House & Chapel, 120 E. Edenton St., Raleigh, NC (Upjohn, Hobart), NRHP-listed
 Church of St. Joseph of Arimathea, 2172 Saw Mill River Rd., Greenburgh, NY (Upjohn, Hobart), NRHP-listed
 First Presbyterian Church, Portico, Steeple, Parish House, & Chapel, Ann and Bow Sts., Fayetteville, NC (Upjohn, Hobart), NRHP-listed
 First Presbyterian Church, 125 S. 3rd St., Wilmington, NC
 Mead Memorial Chapel, 2 Chapel Rd., Lewisboro, NY (Upjohn, Hobart B.), NRHP-listed
 All Saints Episcopal Church (1917) in the Roanoke Rapids Historic District, Roanoke Rapids, NC
 Scarsdale Woman's Club, 37 Drake Rd., Scarsdale, NY (Upjohn, Hobart), NRHP-listed
 St. Athanasius Episcopal Church and Parish House and the Church of the Holy Comforter, 300 E. Webb Ave. and 320 E. Davis St., Burlington, NC (Upjohn, Hobart), NRHP-listed
 St. Catherine's School, 6001 Grove Ave., Richmond, VA (Upjohn, Hobart), NRHP-listed
 St. Luke's Episcopal Church, 68 Bedford Rd., Katonah, New York (Upjohn, Hobart B.), NRHP-listed
 Holy Trinity Episcopal Church, original Parish House, Greensboro, North Carolina
 First Presbyterian Church of Greensboro, Greensboro, North Carolina
 Temple Emanuel, (N. Greene St., Greensboro, North Carolina)
 Unitarian Church of All Souls (1931-32), Lexington Avenue, New York City
 Grace Methodist Church (Greensboro, North Carolina)
 First Presbyterian Church (High Point, North Carolina)
 First Presbyterian Church (Concord, North Carolina)
 The Village Chapel (Pinehurst, North Carolina)
 North Carolina State University Library (now Brooks Hall) (Raleigh, North Carolina)
 North Carolina State University, Bagwell, Becton, and Berry Quadrangle (Raleigh, North Carolina)
 First Presbyterian Church (Houston) (1947) 5300 Main Street, Houston, Texas

See also
 Harde & Short
 Trinity Cathedral. Columbia, SC

References

External links
 Columbia University Libraries: The Upjohn collection of architectural drawings by Richard, Richard Michell, and Hobart Upjohn :Architectural drawings, papers, and records, (circa 1827-1910)
 Guide to the Hobart Upjohn Architectural Drawings of the Roanoke Rapids Senior High School 1920-1938

American ecclesiastical architects
American residential architects
Architects of Anglican churches
Architects of Presbyterian churches
Architects from New York City
Stevens Institute of Technology alumni
1876 births
1949 deaths
20th-century American architects